Drury Lacy Jr. was the third president of Davidson College. A native of Virginia, he was a Presbyterian pastor at a church in New Bern, North Carolina and then in Raleigh, North Carolina before becoming president.

As president, Davidson received a large financial commitment from a Maxwell Chambers, making Davidson the wealthiest private college in the entire South. Lacy left Davidson in 1860 and eventually became a chaplain in the Confederate States Army. After the war, he returned to the ministry until his death.

References

External links 
 Biography from the Davidson College Archives & Special Collections
 Biography from NCpedia

1802 births
1884 deaths
American Presbyterian ministers
Confederate States Army chaplains
Presidents of Davidson College
Union Presbyterian Seminary alumni
19th-century American clergy